Jimbo is the stage name of James Insell, a Canadian designer and drag queen who is known for competing in the first season of Canada's Drag Race (2020) and later the first season of RuPaul's Drag Race: UK vs the World (2022).

Early life and education
Originally from London, Ontario, Insell and his brother Jeff were both interested in creative pursuits from childhood, including early drag play. Respecting his father's wishes that he pursue a career-oriented education, he studied biology at the University of Western Ontario; following graduation, however, he opted not to pursue employment in the field and instead moved to Victoria, British Columbia, where he began working as a costume and production designer.

Career
Insell has worked predominantly in local theatre, including productions of James and the Giant Peach and The Rocky Horror Show, but has also had credits on a number of television films produced by Front Street Pictures for the Hallmark Channel, and on the children's television series Pup Academy.

He appeared in the music video for Victoria musician Adrian Chalifour's single "Open Heart". He also appeared as the drag mother to British Columbian rapper bbno$ for the music video for his song "imma".

He appeared on the first season of Canada's Drag Race in 2020, emerging as a popular fan favourite and winning the key Snatch Game challenge for his performance as Joan Rivers, but was eliminated from the competition in fourth place behind finalists Priyanka, Scarlett BoBo and Rita Baga. For Fierté Montréal's special online edition of its annual Drag Superstars show, which featured all of the Canada's Drag Race queens in prerecorded video performances, Jimbo performed a drag recreation of The Buggles' 1979 hit "Video Killed the Radio Star".

Following Canada's Drag Race he toured the United Kingdom as part of the Klub Kids show with Rock M Sakura and Erika Klash, and was the only queen from the season not to appear at any dates on the Canada's Drag Race Live at the Drive-In tour; however, he did participate alongside Priyanka, Scarlett Bobo and Rita Baga in an online panel discussion as part of the Just for Laughs festival.

During the COVID-19 pandemic in Canada, he also created a line of face masks through his design studio, with every purchase matched by a donation of a free mask to a homeless or low-income person, and launched a Kickstarter campaign to fund the production of House of Jimbo, a comedy and variety series he hopes to launch in the future. Insell has described House of Jimbo as "the framework of a kids show, but really made for adults", comparable to Pee-wee's Playhouse or The Hilarious House of Frightenstein, and the show reached its Kickstarter goal by the end of October 2020. At the same time the Chemainus-based Riot Brewing Company introduced Jimbo, a boysenberry-flavoured craft beer whose profits will go in part to funding House of Jimbo.

In 2021 he made a return appearance in the second season of Canada's Drag Race, appearing in the third episode as the killer in the slasher film-themed acting challenge "Screech".

In January 2022, he was announced as one of the nine contestants on RuPaul's Drag Race: UK vs the World. After winning the first two episodes of the season, Jimbo landed in the bottom two in the third episode and was eliminated by Pangina Heals after Heals won a lipsync against Dutch contestant Janey Jacké to "We Like to Party! (The Vengabus)" by the Vengaboys. Jimbo's early elimination was dubbed one of the most "controversial" in the history of the franchise.

He returned in the third season of Canada's Drag Race in 2022, appearing as a guest judge in the episode "Bitch Stole My Look".

Filmography

Television

Music videos

Internet series

Discography

Singles

As lead artist

As featured artist

References

External links

House of Jimbo

1982 births
Living people
21st-century Canadian LGBT people
Canada's Drag Race contestants
Canadian costume designers
Canadian drag queens
Canadian gay actors
Canadian production designers
Canadian theatre designers
Male actors from London, Ontario
Male actors from Victoria, British Columbia
University of Western Ontario alumni